Gage Park may refer to:

Gage Park, Topeka, Kansas, U.S.A, a city park
Gage Park, Chicago, Illinois, U.S.A,  a community area
Gage Park, Brampton, Ontario, Canada, a city park
Gage Park, Hamilton, Ontario, Canada, a historic city park